"Tunnel of Love" is a 1981 single by Dire Straits. It appears on the 1980 album Making Movies, and subsequently on the live albums Alchemy and Live at the BBC and the greatest hits albums Money for Nothing, Sultans of Swing: The Very Best of Dire Straits, and The Best of Dire Straits & Mark Knopfler: Private Investigations. The song was also featured in the 1982 Richard Gere film An Officer and a Gentleman and was included in the film’s accompanying soundtrack album.

"Tunnel of Love" is one of only three Dire Straits songs not credited to Mark Knopfler alone (the other two are "Money for Nothing" and "What's The Matter Baby?"). The song itself is entirely by Knopfler, but the opening instrumental is an arrangement of the "Carousel Waltz" from the Rodgers and Hammerstein musical Carousel.

The song mentions the Spanish City which, at the time the song was released, housed fun fair rides and amusements, referenced throughout the song. Spanish City is in Whitley Bay, which is also referenced near the end of the song (along with Cullercoats). It tells the story from the protagonist's point of view of meeting a young girl at the amusement park, spending time with her only to lose her in the park and unable to find her again.

Reception
Ultimate Classic Rock critic Michael Gallucci rated "Tunnel of Love" as Dire Straits' 4th best song and said it contains Mark Knopfler's best guitar solo.  Classic Rock critic Paul Rees rated it to be Dire Straits' 2nd best song, saying that it combines "Dylan’s and Springsteen’s biggest moments with Geordie grit."

Chart performance
"Tunnel of Love" reached the position of number 54 in the UK Singles Chart upon its single release in October 1981, a rather modest position despite being one of the band's most famous and popular compositions. However, it fared much better in other countries, especially Italy (#7) and Spain (#11).

Personnel
Dire Straits
 Mark Knopfler – vocals, guitar
 John Illsley – bass, vocals
 Pick Withers – drums, vocals

Additional musicians
 Roy Bittan – piano, Hammond organ
 Sid McGinnis – guitar (uncredited)

Music videos
Two music videos exist for the song, one depicting Mark Knopfler, John Illsley and Pick Withers performing on a blank set, intercut with imagery and actors, most notably the 'heroine' played by a young Leslie Ash relevant to the lyrics, the other featuring a larger band arrangement and telling the story of a couple escaping a group of soldiers who chase them from a funfair.

Live performances
In 1980s concerts, Dire Straits played the central theme of The Animals' "Don't Let Me Be Misunderstood" during an extended instrumental introduction to the song, as Knopfler talked about that group's hometown of Newcastle. Knopfler's outro solo has received numerous plaudits over the years:

Mark Knopfler also sometimes played melody from chorus of "Stop! In the Name of Love" by The Supremes, as an additional intro prior to the "Carousel Waltz" while performing this song live.

Certifications

References

1981 singles
Dire Straits songs
Songs written by Mark Knopfler
Songs with music by Richard Rodgers
Song recordings produced by Mark Knopfler
Song recordings produced by Jimmy Iovine
1980 songs